Dothiorella is a genus of fungi in the family Botryosphaeriaceae. There are 3 subgenera and approximately 322 species.

Species

Dothiorella aberrans
Dothiorella acaciae
Dothiorella aceris
Dothiorella acervulata
Dothiorella adanensis
Dothiorella advena
Dothiorella aesculi
Dothiorella agavicola
Dothiorella ailanthina
Dothiorella alchorneae
Dothiorella alfaedensis
Dothiorella alhagi
Dothiorella allescheri
Dothiorella amsoniae
Dothiorella amygdali
Dothiorella annonae
Dothiorella apocyni
Dothiorella aquilegiae
Dothiorella arachidis
Dothiorella araucariae
Dothiorella argyreiae
Dothiorella armeniaca
Dothiorella aromatica
Dothiorella arundinacea
Dothiorella asiminae
Dothiorella asparagi
Dothiorella aterrima
Dothiorella aucubae
Dothiorella banksiae
Dothiorella barringtoniae
Dothiorella berengeriana
Dothiorella betulae
Dothiorella betulae-odoratae
Dothiorella betulicola
Dothiorella biotae
Dothiorella bohemica
Dothiorella bokensis
Dothiorella bolbophila
Dothiorella botrya
Dothiorella botryosphaerioides
Dothiorella bougainvilleae
Dothiorella boussingaultiae
Dothiorella brassicae
Dothiorella brevicollis
Dothiorella brevipes
Dothiorella broussonetiae
Dothiorella caballeroi
Dothiorella caespitosa
Dothiorella calophylli
Dothiorella calospora
Dothiorella calotropidis
Dothiorella campsidis
Dothiorella canadensis
Dothiorella candollei
Dothiorella caricis
Dothiorella carpinicola
Dothiorella carthami
Dothiorella caryotae
Dothiorella caseariae
Dothiorella castaneae
Dothiorella castillejae
Dothiorella casuarinae
Dothiorella catalpae
Dothiorella cedrelae
Dothiorella celastri
Dothiorella celtidis
Dothiorella cephalandrae
Dothiorella cercidospora
Dothiorella chamaedoreae
Dothiorella chenopodii
Dothiorella chilensis
Dothiorella chimonanthi
Dothiorella chrysopogonis
Dothiorella cisti
Dothiorella clavigera
Dothiorella clypeata
Dothiorella cneori
Dothiorella cocoës
Dothiorella codiaeicola
Dothiorella coggygriae
Dothiorella concaviuscula
Dothiorella congesta
Dothiorella convolvuli
Dothiorella coronillae
Dothiorella corylina
Dothiorella crastophila
Dothiorella crataegi
Dothiorella crepinii
Dothiorella cupressi
Dothiorella cydoniae
Dothiorella daniellae
Dothiorella daphnes
Dothiorella dasycarpi
Dothiorella dauci
Dothiorella davidiae
Dothiorella davisii
Dothiorella decorticata
Dothiorella desmostachyae
Dothiorella diatrypea
Dothiorella diatrypoides
Dothiorella diospyri
Dothiorella dispar
Dothiorella divergens
Dothiorella dominicana
Dothiorella dracaenae
Dothiorella dryophila
Dothiorella dulcispinae
Dothiorella dura
Dothiorella ellisii
Dothiorella endorrhodia
Dothiorella ephedrae
Dothiorella erumpens
Dothiorella erythraea
Dothiorella erythrinae
Dothiorella eucalypti
Dothiorella eucalyptorum
Dothiorella eugeniae
Dothiorella euonymicola
Dothiorella euonymi-japonicae
Dothiorella euphorbiae
Dothiorella euphorbii
Dothiorella everhartii
Dothiorella excavata
Dothiorella fabae
Dothiorella fici
Dothiorella ficina
Dothiorella foederata
Dothiorella frangulae
Dothiorella fraxinea
Dothiorella fraxini
Dothiorella fraxinicola
Dothiorella fructicola
Dothiorella galegae
Dothiorella gallae
Dothiorella gaurensis
Dothiorella genistae
Dothiorella glandaria
Dothiorella glandicola
Dothiorella gleditschiae
Dothiorella graminicola
Dothiorella gregaria
Dothiorella guaranitica
Dothiorella hawaiiensis
Dothiorella henriquesiana
Dothiorella hibiscicola
Dothiorella hicoriae
Dothiorella hippocastani
Dothiorella hispalensis
Dothiorella hoffmannii
Dothiorella holstii
Dothiorella hypomutilospora
Dothiorella iberica
Dothiorella ilicella
Dothiorella ilicicola
Dothiorella inaequalis
Dothiorella indica
Dothiorella insulana
Dothiorella inversa
Dothiorella ipomoeae
Dothiorella jaapiana
Dothiorella jasminicola
Dothiorella juglandaria
Dothiorella juniperi
Dothiorella kanoorii
Dothiorella kilinensis
Dothiorella kraunhiae
Dothiorella ladharensis
Dothiorella lagenariae
Dothiorella lagerstroemiae
Dothiorella lanceolata
Dothiorella latitans
Dothiorella laurina
Dothiorella ledi
Dothiorella lentiformis
Dothiorella leucaenicola
Dothiorella limbalis
Dothiorella limonis
Dothiorella lineolata
Dothiorella liriodendri
Dothiorella longicollis
Dothiorella lonicerae
Dothiorella macadamiae
Dothiorella macarangae
Dothiorella maculosa
Dothiorella magnifructa
Dothiorella mahagoni
Dothiorella major
Dothiorella mali
Dothiorella manshurica
Dothiorella meliae
Dothiorella microspora
Dothiorella minor
Dothiorella mirabilis
Dothiorella moneti
Dothiorella monsterae
Dothiorella mori
Dothiorella multicocca
Dothiorella multiplex
Dothiorella myricariae
Dothiorella nectandrae
Dothiorella negundinis
Dothiorella nelumbii
Dothiorella nucis
Dothiorella nuptialis
Dothiorella oenotherae
Dothiorella olearum
Dothiorella ononidicola
Dothiorella opuntiae
Dothiorella ornella
Dothiorella oxycedri
Dothiorella palawanensis
Dothiorella paliuri
Dothiorella parasitica
Dothiorella paucilocelata
Dothiorella paulowniae
Dothiorella peckiana
Dothiorella pedrosensis
Dothiorella pericarpica
Dothiorella peucedani
Dothiorella philodendri
Dothiorella phoenicis
Dothiorella phomiformis
Dothiorella phomopsis
Dothiorella phormiana
Dothiorella photiniae
Dothiorella physalospora
Dothiorella pinea
Dothiorella pinicola
Dothiorella pini-silvestris
Dothiorella pirottiana
Dothiorella pistaciicola
Dothiorella pithyophila
Dothiorella pittospori
Dothiorella pittosporina
Dothiorella pitya
Dothiorella placenta
Dothiorella platani
Dothiorella platensis
Dothiorella populea
Dothiorella populina
Dothiorella populnea
Dothiorella prosopidina
Dothiorella proteiformis
Dothiorella pseudodiblasta
Dothiorella pyri
Dothiorella pyricola
Dothiorella quercina
Dothiorella radicans
Dothiorella ranunculi
Dothiorella reniformis
Dothiorella rhaphidophorae
Dothiorella rhododendri
Dothiorella rhoina
Dothiorella ribicola
Dothiorella ricini
Dothiorella rimicola
Dothiorella robiniae
Dothiorella rosatti
Dothiorella rugulosa
Dothiorella rumicis
Dothiorella saccharina
Dothiorella salviae
Dothiorella sanninii
Dothiorella santali
Dothiorella santaremica
Dothiorella saponariae
Dothiorella sarmentorum
Dothiorella scandens
Dothiorella schizomyiae
Dothiorella schoenocauli
Dothiorella scirpi-riparii
Dothiorella scopulina
Dothiorella scripta
Dothiorella senecionis
Dothiorella sibiraeae
Dothiorella sileris
Dothiorella sisalanae
Dothiorella sorbina
Dothiorella partiicola
Dothiorella spathoglottidicola
Dothiorella sterculiae
Dothiorella stramonii
Dothiorella stratosa
Dothiorella strobilina
Dothiorella strobilomorphospora
Dothiorella stromatica
Dothiorella syringae
Dothiorella syringicola
Dothiorella tamaricicola
Dothiorella tamaricis
Dothiorella tecomae
Dothiorella thripina
Dothiorella thripsita
Dothiorella tiliae
Dothiorella togashiana
Dothiorella torulosa
Dothiorella toxica
Dothiorella tricholenae
Dothiorella tristaniae
Dothiorella tubericola
Dothiorella turconii
Dothiorella ulmi
Dothiorella ulmicola
Dothiorella undulata
Dothiorella urae
Dothiorella vagans
Dothiorella valentina
Dothiorella viburni
Dothiorella vinosa
Dothiorella viscariae
Dothiorella viticis
Dothiorella viticola
Dothiorella winteri
Dothiorella woronowii
Dothiorella yuccicarpa
Dothiorella zeae

External links
Index Fungorum

 
Dothideomycetes genera